Christon Bank railway station served the village of Christon Bank, Northumberland, England from 1847 to 1965 on the East Coast Main Line.

History 
The station was opened on 1 July 1847 by the York, Newcastle and Berwick Railway; it was situated north of the level crossing on the B6347 at Springfield View. There were two sidings behind the north end of the down platform (these served the coal depot) and there was a goods warehouse adjacent to the up passenger platform and north of the level crossing. The station was one of the stations that closed for the Second World War. It was reopened by the London and North Eastern Railway on 7 October 1946. The Sunday services may have not been restored after it reopened. The station first closed to passengers on 15 September 1958 and closed completely on 7 June 1965.

References

External links 

Disused railway stations in Northumberland
Former North Eastern Railway (UK) stations
Railway stations in Great Britain opened in 1847
Railway stations in Great Britain closed in 1941
Railway stations in Great Britain opened in 1946
Railway stations in Great Britain closed in 1958
Embleton, Northumberland